The 2017 Malé League is the seventh season of the Malé League, the top division of Maldivian football under the latest update of the Maldivian football league system. The league was made up of the 8 clubs.

Format
All eight teams play against each other in Two Round Format. Team with most total points at the end of the season will be crowned as Malé League champion and qualified to the AFC Cup. Top four teams qualify for the Dhivehi Premier League and the President's Cup. Bottom four teams play the Malé League qualification with the champion and the runner-up of Second Division.

Top four teams of Malé League qualification after one round will play in the next year's Malé League. Bottom two will be relegated to Second Division.

Teams
A total of 8 teams will be contesting in the league.

Teams and their divisions
Note: Table lists clubs in alphabetical order.

Personnel

Note: Flags indicate national team as has been defined under FIFA eligibility rules. Players may hold more than one non-FIFA nationality.

Coaching changes

Foreign players

Players name in bold indicates the player is registered during the mid-season transfer window.

League table

Season summary

Round One & Two

Positions by round
The table lists the positions of teams after each week of matches.

Last updated:

Matches

First round
A total of 28 matches will be played in this round.

Second round
A total of 28 matches will be played in this round.

Season statistics

Top scorers

Hat-tricks

Note
(2) – Second round match

2018 Malé League qualification

Qualification league table

Note! Zefrol & Kudahenveiru decided to withdraw before starting of the qualification. Therefore other teams automatically qualified to 2018 Malé League without playing the qualification Round.

References
 Maldives football league system 2017 on Mihaaru Online. 4 Jan 2017 (Dhivehi)
 Minivan C'ship top 4 to PL  on Mihaaru Online. 4 Jan 2017 (Dhivehi)

Football leagues in the Maldives
Maldives
1